Vladimir Olegovich Leshonok (born 14 August 1984) is a Russian former professional footballer.

Club career
He made his debut in the Russian Premier League in 2004 for FC Spartak Moscow. He played 5 games and scored 1 goal in the UEFA Intertoto Cup 2004 for FC Spartak Moscow.

References

1984 births
Sportspeople from Omsk
Living people
Russian footballers
Russia under-21 international footballers
Association football midfielders
FC Spartak Moscow players
FC Spartak Vladikavkaz players
FC Salyut Belgorod players
Russian Premier League players
FC Krasnodar players
FC Yenisey Krasnoyarsk players
FC Tyumen players
FC Shinnik Yaroslavl players
FC Irtysh Omsk players
FC Spartak Nizhny Novgorod players